Hook and ladder may refer to:

Hook-and-ladder truck, a firefighting apparatus
Hook and ladder (chess), or deflection sacrifice, a chess tactic
Hook and ladder (football), a type of trick play used in gridiron football, also known as a hook and lateral

Media
The Gong on the Hook and Ladder, a short composition by American composer Charles Ives
Hook and Ladder (1924 film), a film starring Hoot Gibson
Hook and Ladder (1932 film), an Our Gang film

Historic structures
All located in the United States
 Aetna Hose, Hook and Ladder Company Fire Station No. 1, in New Castle County, Delaware
 Aetna Hose, Hook and Ladder Company, Fire Station No. 2, in New Castle County, Delaware
 Andover Hook and Ladder Company Building, in  Andover, Maine
 Cold Spring Harbor Fire District Hook and Ladder Company Building, in Suffolk County, New York
 Engine House No. 2 and Hook and Ladder No. 9, in Erie County, New York
 Hook and Ladder No. 1 and Hose Co. No. 2, in Grand Forks, North Dakota
 Hook and Ladder No. 3, in Hudson County, New Jersey
 Hook and Ladder No. 4, in Albany, New York
 Hook and Ladder House No. 5–Detroit Fire Department Repair Shop, in Detroit, Michigan
 Hose and Hook and Ladder Truck Building, in Thomaston, Connecticut
 Keystone Hook and Ladder Company, in Reading, Berks County, Pennsylvania
 Morgan Hook and Ladder Company, in Ontario County, New York
 Number 4 Hook and Ladder Company, in Dallas, Texas
 W. H. Bradford Hook and Ladder Fire House, in Bennington, Vermont

See also